Rebecca Soni (born March 18, 1987) is an American former competition swimmer and breaststroke specialist who is a six-time Olympic medalist.  She is a former world record-holder in the 100-meter breaststroke (short and long course) and the 200-meter breaststroke (short and long course), and is the first woman to swim the 200-meter breaststroke in under 2 minutes 20 seconds.  As a member of the U.S. national team, she held the world record in the 4×100-meter medley relay from 2012 to 2017 (long course).

Soni has won a total of twenty-two medals in major international competition, fourteen gold, seven silver, and one bronze spanning the Olympics, the World, the Universiade, and the Pan Pacific Championships.  She burst onto the international scene at the 2008 Summer Olympics where she won two silver medals and one gold.  In the 200-meter breaststroke at the Olympics, she set the world record en route to winning gold, shocking Australian favorite Leisel Jones. Four years later at the 2012 Summer Olympics, Soni successfully defended her Olympic title in the 200-meter breaststroke in world record time, becoming the first woman to do so in the event.

She was named Swimming World'''s World Swimmer of the Year award in 2010 and 2011, and the American Swimmer of the Year award in 2009, 2010 and 2011.

Early and Personal life
Soni was born in Freehold, New Jersey, U.S. Her father Peter is of Hungarian-Jewish descent; his family and him emigrated from Cluj-Napoca, Transilvania (now in Romania), from which their families had been deported during World War II. Her Jewish paternal grandfather Poli Schoenberg survived the Auschwitz concentration camp, whereas his parents lost their lives in the Holocaust. Her father's first marriage was to an American woman, whom he met during his studies, they resided together in the United States, but eventually had a divorce. Her mother Kinga is her father's second marriage. She also has distant relatives in Israel.

Soni is a 2005 graduate of West Windsor-Plainsboro High School North in Plainsboro Township, New Jersey. She held many school records and leads the school and state in many swimming strokes. In July 2006 she had a cardiac ablation.

In August 2010, Soni became a spokeswoman for the United Nations Foundation's Girl Up campaign.  The organization focuses on improving the lives of the world's adolescent girls.

Career
At USC, Soni was a six-time NCAA Champion, having won the 200-yard breaststroke in 2006 through 2009 and the 100-yard breaststroke in 2008 and 2009.

Early career
As a 17-year-old at the 2004 U.S. Olympic Team Trials, Soni finished 15th overall in the 100-meter breaststroke and 11th overall in the 200-meter breaststroke. The following year, at the 2005 World Championship Trials, Soni just missed a spot on the 2005 World Aquatic team after finishing third in the 200-meter breaststroke behind Tara Kirk and Kristen Caverly. Soni also placed fourth in the 100-meter breaststroke. At the 2005 Summer Universiade, Soni earned her first international medals by winning silver in the 100-meter and 200-meter breaststroke and gold in the 4×100-meter medley relay. At the 2006 World Short Course Championships, Soni finished in 4th place in the 200-meter breaststroke. Just a few weeks before the 2006 National Championships, Soni underwent a procedure called radiofrequency ablation to help regulate her heartbeat.  Although it was not health-threatening, Soni would sometimes experience a high heart rate which sometimes interfered with her training. At the 2006 National Championships, the selection meet for the 2006 Pan Pacific Swimming Championships and the 2007 World Aquatics Championships, Soni finished tenth overall in both the 100-meter and 200-meter breaststroke.

2008
2008 Olympic Trials
At the 2008 U.S. Olympic Team Trials, Soni competed in two events, the 100-meter and 200-meter breaststroke.  In the 100-meter breaststroke, Soni finished fourth in a time of 1:07.80. Usually, the top two finishers would qualify for the Olympics.  However, after second-place finisher Jessica Hardy withdrew from the team due to a doping violation and third-place finisher Tara Kirk missed the entry deadline, Soni was chosen to swim the event. Soni earned her berth by being the swimmer already on the team with the fastest time in the event since January 1, 2006. In the 200-meter breaststroke, Soni won with a time of 2:22.60, the third-fastest finish as of that date.

2008 Summer Olympics

At the 2008 Summer Olympics, Soni won a silver medal in the 100-meter breaststroke, finishing behind world record holder Leisel Jones of Australia 1:06.73 to 1:05.17. In the 200-meter breaststroke, Soni upset the heavily favored Jones, winning the gold medal and breaking Jones's world record with a time of 2:20.22.  Jones finished second with a time of 2:22.05. After the race, Soni said, "It's been a long road to get here, I can't believe what just happened." Soni then combined with Natalie Coughlin, Christine Magnuson, and Dara Torres in the 4×100-meter medley relay to finish second behind Australia.  Soni had the second best split time in the field (1:05.95) behind Jones (1:04.58).

2009
2009 National Championships
At the 2009 National Championships Soni competed in two events, the 100-meter and 200-meter breaststroke.  In the 100-meter breaststroke, Soni easily won with a time of 1:05.34. In the 200-meter breaststroke, Soni again exhibited dominance by finishing first with a time of 2:20.38, just off her world record pace.

2009 World Aquatics Championships

At the 2009 World Aquatics Championships, held in Rome, Soni set a meet record in the heats of the 100-meter breaststroke, with a time of 1:05.66. In the semi-final, Soni recorded a time of 1:04.84 to set a new world record and become the first female to finish under 1:05 for the event. In the final of the 100-meter breaststroke, Soni won the gold with a time of 1:04.93. Despite being the favorite in the 200-meter breaststroke, Soni went out too fast in the first half of the race and faded in the final meters, ultimately placing fourth. In the 50-meter breaststroke, Soni was narrowly beaten for the gold and the world record by two one-hundredths (0.02) of a second by Russian swimmer Yuliya Yefimova.

For her performance at the World Championships, she was named the American Swimmer of the Year by Swimming World Magazine.

2009 Duel in the Pool
Soni then competed at the 2009 Duel in the Pool, a short course meet held in December at Manchester.  In the 200-meter breaststroke, Soni broke Leisel Jones' world record with a time of 2:14.57. One day later, Soni swam a 1:02.70 in the 100-meter breaststroke to break Jones' world record of 1:03.00.

2010
2010 National Championships
At the 2010 National Championships, Soni qualified to compete at the 2010 Pan Pacific Swimming Championships in the 100 and 200-meter breaststroke.  In the 100-meter breaststroke, Soni won in a time of 1:05.73. In the 200-meter breaststroke, Soni easily won with a time of 2:21.60, almost five seconds ahead of second-place finisher Amanda Beard.

2010 Pan Pacific Swimming Championships
At the 2010 Pan Pacific Swimming Championships, Soni won a total of three gold medals.  In the 100-meter breaststroke, Soni recorded the third fastest time in history and the fastest time recorded in a textile suit with a 1:04.93 to win the gold medal ahead of Australians Leisel Jones and Sarah Katsoulis.  Her time was also the fastest ever recorded in a textile swimsuit. Two days after the 100-meter breaststroke, Soni then competed in the 200-meter breaststroke and the 4×100-meter medley relay.  In the 200-meter breaststroke, Soni dominated the field with a time of 2:20.69.  Leisel Jones came in second in 2:23.23 and world record holder Annamay Pierse came in third with a time of 2:23.65. Less than an hour after the event, Soni competed in the 4×100-meter medley relay with Natalie Coughlin, Dana Vollmer and Jessica Hardy.  Performing the breaststroke leg, Soni recorded a time of 1:05.35, the fastest in the field; the American team went on to win the gold in a time of 3:55.23.

For her performance at the Pan Pacific Swimming Championships, Soni was named the World Swimmer of the Year and American Swimmer of the Year by Swimming World Magazine.

2010 Short Course World Championships
At the end of 2010, Soni competed at the 2010 World Short Course Championships in Dubai, where she won three gold medals and one silver.  Soni swept all the breaststroke events and individually set four championship records.

2011

2011 World Aquatics Championships

Soni won her first gold medal in the 100-meter breaststroke.  After posting the top times in the heats (1:05.54) and semi-finals (1:04.91), Soni recorded a time of 1:05.05 in the final for the win.  Her winning time was over a second ahead of second-place finisher Leisel Jones. In her second event, the 200-meter breaststroke, Soni won with a time of 2:21.47, her first gold medal in the event at a long course World Championships.  However, her time in the final was slightly slower than her semi-final time of 2:21.03. In the 4×100-meter medley relay, Soni won gold with Natalie Coughlin, Dana Vollmer, and Missy Franklin with a time of 3:52.36, over three seconds ahead of second-place finisher China.  Swimming the breaststroke leg, Soni had a split of 1:04.71.  The final time of 3:52.36 for the medley relay was the second-fastest effort of all time, just behind the Chinese-owned world record of 3:52.19. In her last event, the 50-meter breaststroke, Soni finished in third place behind Jessica Hardy and Yuliya Yefimova.

At the year's end, Soni was named the World Swimmer of the Year and American Swimmer of the Year by Swimming World, and defended her titles from 2010.

2012
2012 Summer Olympics

At the 2012 Summer Olympics in London, Soni won her inaugural medal, a silver, in the 100-meter breaststroke, finishing 0.08 seconds behind 15-year-old Lithuanian Rūta Meilutytė and repeating her result from the 2008 Olympics. After topping the heats of the 200-metre breaststroke with a time of 2:21.40, and breaking Annamay Pierse's world record in the semi-finals with a time of 2:20.00, Soni won a gold medal in the final of the 200-meter breaststroke with a time of 2:19.59, breaking her own world record and becoming the first woman ever to break 2 minutes 20 seconds in the event.Crouse, Karen (August 2, 2012). "Soni Sets World Record to Win 200 Breaststroke". The New York Times. Retrieved September 5, 2022. With her win, Soni became the first female to successfully defend her title in the event.  In her final event, the 4×100-meter medley relay, she won gold with Missy Franklin, Dana Vollmer and Allison Schmitt.  Swimming the breaststroke leg, she recorded a time of 1:04.82, and the U.S. team went on to set a new world record with a time of 3:52.05, bettering the previous Chinese-owned record of 3:52.19 set in 2009.

2013
Soni took the year off to recover from a back injury, but returned to the 2013 World Aquatics Championships as a spectator.

2021
On October 9, 2021, Soni was inducted into the International Swimming Hall of Fame. Originally scheduled to be inducted into the Class of 2020, her induction was delayed from April 24–25, 2020 due to the COVID-19 Pandemic. The week of her being announced as a future inductee, Swimming World'' ranked the announcement and her as future induction as number five for their "The Week That Was" honor, three spots behind fellow breaststroker Meghan Dressel getting engaged to Caeleb Dressel.

Personal bests
.

World records

 Record set in a short course pool.
 Short course record with Natalie Coughlin, Dana Vollmer, and Missy Franklin.
 The first woman to swim in under 2 minutes 20 seconds in the event.
 Record set with Missy Franklin, Dana Vollmer, and Allison Schmitt.

See also

 List of multiple Olympic gold medalists
 List of Olympic medalists in swimming (women)
 List of United States records in swimming
 List of University of Southern California people
 List of World Aquatics Championships medalists in swimming (women)
 List of world records in swimming
 World record progression 100 metres breaststroke
 World record progression 200 metres breaststroke
 World record progression 4 × 100 metres medley relay

References

External links
 
 
 
 
 
 
 

1987 births
American Ashkenazi Jews
American female breaststroke swimmers
American people of Hungarian-Jewish descent
American people of Romanian-Jewish descent
Living people
Medalists at the 2005 Summer Universiade
Medalists at the 2008 Summer Olympics
Medalists at the 2012 Summer Olympics
Medalists at the FINA World Swimming Championships (25 m)
Olympic gold medalists for the United States in swimming
Olympic silver medalists for the United States in swimming
People from Freehold Borough, New Jersey
People from Plainsboro Township, New Jersey
Sportspeople from Middlesex County, New Jersey
Sportspeople from Monmouth County, New Jersey
Swimmers at the 2008 Summer Olympics
Swimmers at the 2012 Summer Olympics
Swimmers from New Jersey
Universiade gold medalists for the United States
Universiade medalists in swimming
Universiade silver medalists for the United States
USC Annenberg School for Communication and Journalism alumni
USC Trojans women's swimmers
World Aquatics Championships medalists in swimming
World record holders in swimming